Naejangsan is a mountain located on the border of North Jeolla and South Jeolla provinces in southwestern South Korea, approximately three hours drive south of Seoul.

National park
Naejangsan forms the core of Naejangsan National Park. It is located nearby the city of Jeongeup and is a very popular tourist destination, particularly in autumn due to its spectacular autumn foliage.

Naejang means that something hidden in the mountain is infinite. The mountain is located in the boundary between Jeong-up and Sun-chang. It is one of the best mountains in Korea. And it has been famous for its fall foliage for more than 500 years. On 17 November 1971, the mountain became a national park. During peak season, there are about 100,000 tourists per day visiting, and there are around a million tourists per year. In the spring, there are cherry blossoms on the mostly green mountain. In the summer, there is ample shade from the trees. In the autumn, there is bright fall foliage. In the winter, there is snow. The mountain is very attractive in all four seasons. On the local trail map, Naejangsan mountain is marked Sinseonbong. It is possible to hike a circuit with 9 summits, all ranging between 622 and 763m altitude, in around 4–7 hours.

Transportation
There are bus and train stations in Jeong-up that connect to Naejangsan. Both stations are less than 20 km from the mountain. The train station is on the Honam Line, which provides for visitors coming from Seoul(Yongsan Station) or Gwang-ju. KTX (Korea Train eXpress) is available from Yongsan to Jeong-up, which takes about 1 1/2 hours. Coming from Seoul by bus, takes about 3 hours. From the station, bus No.171 (between 6:25–21:00) can reach the Naejangsan bus station located next to the mountain in around 30 minutes.

See also

 List of mountains in Korea
 National parks of South Korea

Notes

References

External links 
 Naejangsan National Park

Mountains of South Korea
Jeongeup
Sunchang County
Jangseong County
Mountains of North Jeolla Province